Robert Roy "Bobby" Burt (23 May 1934 – 29 September 2017) was an Australian rules footballer who played with North Melbourne in the Victorian Football League (VFL).

Notes

External links 

2017 deaths
1934 births
Australian rules footballers from Victoria (Australia)
North Melbourne Football Club players